The 33rd Lo Nuestro Awards ceremony, presented and televised by American television network Univision and Las Estrellas, will recognize the most popular Spanish-language music of 2020 that was played on Uforia Audio Network during the year in 35 categories. The ceremony was held on February 18, 2021 at the American Airlines Arena in Miami.

Performers
Below is the list of the live performances of the artists and the songs they performed:

Winners and nominees 

The nominees for the 33rd Lo Nuestro Awards were announced digitally on January 12, 2021 by Univision.

General

Pop

Urban

Tropical

Regional Mexican

Special Merit Awards
Trajectory Award: Gloria Trevi
Musical Legacy Award: Los Ángeles Azules
Excellence Award: Wisin

References  

2021 music awards
2021 awards in the United States
Lo Nuestro Awards by year
2021 in Latin music